Boroviće may refer to:
Boroviće (Raška), village in Serbia
Boroviće (Sjenica), village in Serbia